The 2015–16 Alabama A&M Bulldogs basketball team represented Alabama Agricultural and Mechanical University during the 2015–16 NCAA Division I men's basketball season. The Bulldogs, led by fifth year head coach Willie Hayes, played their home games at Elmore Gymnasium and were members of the Southwestern Athletic Conference. The Bulldogs finished the season with a record of 11–18, 6–12 in conference and finished in a three way tie for seventh place. They lost to Texas Southern in the quarterfinals of the SWAC tournament.

Roster

Schedule

|-
!colspan=9 style="background:#800000; color:#FFFFFF;"| Regular season

|-
!colspan=9 style="background:#800000; color:#FFFFFF;"|SWAC regular season

 

|-
!colspan=9 style="background:#800000; color:#FFFFFF;"| SWAC tournament

References

Alabama A&M Bulldogs basketball seasons
Alabama AandM